Yáng is a Chinese surname. According to a 2013 study it was the 186	th-most common surname, shared by 670,000 people or 0.050% of the population, with the province with the most being Hunan.

Notable people
 Yang Tung-yi, Taiwanese baseball player

See also 
 Ouyang (歐陽/欧阳)

References

Individual Chinese surnames